Sutysky is an urban-type settlement in Vinnytsia Raion of Vinnytsia Oblast in Ukraine. It is located on the left bank of the Southern Bug. Sutysky hosts the administration of Sutysky settlement hromada, one of the hromadas of Ukraine. Population: 

Until 18 July 2020, Sutysky belonged to Tyvriv Raion. The raion was abolished in July 2020 as part of the administrative reform of Ukraine, which reduced the number of raions of Vinnytsia Oblast to six. The area of Tyvriv Raion was merged into Vinnytsia Raion.

Economy

Transportation
It is on the railway connecting Vinnytsia and Zhmerynka. There is intensive passenger traffic.

The settlement is connected by road with Hinvan and Tyvriv where it has further connections to Vinnytsia and Nemyriv.

References

Urban-type settlements in Vinnytsia Raion